, also known by Cheng Fu, was a Chinese politician and diplomat of the Ryukyu Kingdom.

Tei Fuku was born in Raozhou, Jiangxi, Ming China. He was a descendant of the neo-Confucian philosopher Cheng Hao. It is still a mystery when and why he came to Ryukyu. During Satto's reign, Tei Fuku and another Chinese immigrant , were Aji and served as  when the Ryukyuans received Chinese envoys to collect tribute.

In 1411, he was 81 years old, and asked for retirement and said that he wanted to go back home. His request was approved by the Yongle Emperor. After he returned to China, his position was turned to his colleague Ō Mō.

References

Aji (Ryukyu)
People of the Ryukyu Kingdom
Ryukyuan people
15th-century Ryukyuan people
Sessei
Ryukyuan people of Chinese descent